These are Cardiff City Football Club matches in Europe. Cardiff have only entered one European Competition as of 2021, which is the European Cup Winners' Cup. Their first European match was in 1964 against Esbjerg fB which they drew 0-0 at the Blue Water Arena in Esbjerg. The farthest that Cardiff advanced to was the 1967-68 semi-finals. As of 2008 Cardiff have had multiple games in friendly games held in Portugal as part of a pre-season friendly tour, which are also included in the list along with home game friendlies against foreign clubs.

Earlier tours included ones in 1924 when Cardiff played Sparta Prague (twice), Borussia, SV Hamburg and First Vienna and 1928 saw a tour to Denmark where Aarhus, Aalborg and Odense Comb were the opponents. Games were played in Ireland against an Ulster XI and Derry City in May 1950. In 1961 a tour to Ireland saw games against Shamrock Rovers and Waterford, whilst in 1964 Juventus, AS Roma and Latina were the opponents in Italy. In 1968 Cardiff toured Australia and New Zealand playing 14 matches over 6 weeks. 1969 saw a tour to Mauritius and Zambia playing three times against each country. Later tours have included a pre-season tour to Denmark in August 1979 and one to Scotland in 1980.

Home friendlies have included defeats against Moscow Dynamo in 1945 by 10-1, ADO The Hague in 1970, and wins over Lugano in September 1959, Kickers Offenbach in 1962, FC Schalke 04 in 1971 with the game against SV Werder Bremen in 1969 being a draw. The 1960-61 season saw home friendly wins over Grasshoppers Zurich, which was also the Ninian Park Floodlight Opening game on 5 October, and FC Biel, and a loss to VfL Osnabruck.

Competitive Matches

Friendlies

Finals

Semi-finals

Overall Record

By competition

By Country

Notes and references
 Cardiff won 1-0 in the play-off round against FC Torpedo Moscow.
 Cardiff lost on in a Penalty Shootout against Dynamo Berlin.
 Cardiff beat Servette FC on away goals.

References

Europe
Welsh football clubs in international competitions